Route 875 is a  long east to west secondary highway in the south-eastern portion of New Brunswick, Canada.

Route description
Most of the route is in Kings County.

The route's eastern terminus is in Lower Millstream at Route 880, where it travels east through a mostly wooded area to Searsville.  From here, the route continues through Pascobac and ends in the community of Belleisle Creek at Route 870.

History

See also

References

875
875